Exochi is a village and a community of the Pylaia-Chortiatis municipality. Before the 2011 local government reform it was part of the municipality of Chortiatis, of which it was a municipal district. The 2011 census recorded 1,280 inhabitants in the community. The community of Exochi covers an area of 2.575 km2.

See also
 List of settlements in the Thessaloniki regional unit

References

Populated places in Thessaloniki (regional unit)